Balaclava is a 1928 British silent war film directed by Maurice Elvey and Milton Rosmer and starring Cyril McLaglen, Benita Hume, Alf Goddard, Harold Huth, and Wally Patch. A British army officer is cashiered, and re-enlists as a private to take part in the Crimean War and succeeds in capturing a top Russian spy. The film climaxes with the Charge of the Light Brigade.  It was made by Gainsborough Pictures with David Lean working as a production assistant. The charge sequences were filmed on the Long Valley in Aldershot in Hampshire.

Cast
 Cyril McLaglen as John Kennedy 
 Benita Hume as Jean McDonald 
 Alf Goddard as Nobby 
 Miles Mander as Captain Gardner 
 J. Fisher White as Lord Raglan 
 Henry Mollison as Prisoner's Friend 
 Betty Bolton as Natasha 
 Robert Holmes as Father Nikolai 
 Harold Huth as Captain Nolan, Adjutant 
 Wally Patch as Trooper Strang 
 H. St. Barbe West as Prosecutor 
 Boris Ranevsky as Tsar 
 Wallace Bosco as Lord Palmerston 
 Marian Drada as Queen Victoria

Production
Portions of Balaclava were reshot under the direction of Milton Rosmer with dialogue written by Robert Stevenson and it was rereleased using a synchronized soundtrack in April 1930.

References

External links
 
Film still

1928 films
1920s historical films
1928 war films
British historical films
British war films
British silent feature films
Crimean War films
1920s English-language films
Films based on works by Alfred, Lord Tennyson
Films directed by Maurice Elvey
Gainsborough Pictures films
Films set in 1854
Films set in London
Films set in Ukraine
British black-and-white films
Films based on poems
Silent war films
1920s British films